Křenice is a municipality and village in Klatovy District in the Plzeň Region of the Czech Republic. It has about 200 inhabitants.

Administrative parts
Villages of Kámen and Přetín are administrative parts of Křenice.

Gallery

References

Villages in Klatovy District